Coon Island is an island in the Multnomah Channel in Columbia County, Oregon, United States. The entire island is a park known as JJ Collins Marine Memorial Park. Coon Island includes docks on both sides, and is primarily used for recreational activities such as picnicking, boating, camping, and birdwatching.

References

River islands of Oregon
Landforms of Columbia County, Oregon
Uninhabited islands of Oregon